Notable software MIDI editors and sequencers are listed in the following table.

See also
 List of scorewriters
 Comparison of free software for audio
 MIDI Show Control
 MIDI Show Control software
 List of music software
 :Category:MIDI standards

References

Software synthesizers
Multimedia software comparisons